Bid Mohammadi or Bid-Mohammadi (also Romanized as Bīd Moḩammadī; also known as Rūd Shīr-e Bālā and Rūd Shīr-e Bīd Moḩammadī) is a village in Khafri Rural District, in the Central District of Sepidan County, Fars Province, Iran. At the 2006 census, its population was 35, in 6 families.

References 

Populated places in Sepidan County